VRZ Karlovo or Vagono-remonten zavod Karlovo ( - 'Wagon Repair Plant Karlovo'), mostly known as , was established in 1923 in Karlovo with principal business activities in repairs of railway cars and production of spare parts.

Since 2007 the focus of the company was shifted on design, development and manufacturing of a railway car for the Bulgarian and European markets – cars type Sgnss (container wagon), Zas/Zaes/Zacns (tank wagons for light and heavy petroleum products, acids), Eaos/Eanos (open wagons for bulk goods), etc. In present days, the company's activity includes railway cars repairing and manufacturing services, railway equipment, spare parts production, assemblies and units for the rolling stock.

See also 
 Railroad car
 List of rolling stock manufacturers

External links
 VRZ Karlovo corporate website

1964 establishments in Bulgaria
Vehicle manufacturing companies established in 1964
Rolling stock manufacturers of Bulgaria